Shivshankar Menon (born 5 July 1949) is an Indian diplomat, who served as National Security Adviser of India under Prime Minister of India Manmohan Singh. He had previously served as the Foreign Secretary in the Ministry of External Affairs. Prior to that he was Indian High Commissioner to Pakistan, and Sri Lanka and ambassador to China and Israel. He is currently Visiting Professor of International Relations at Ashoka University.

Early life and education
Shivshankar Menon hails from Ottapalam in Palakkad district of Kerala. He comes from a Nair family of diplomats; his father Parappil Narayana Menon served as the ambassador to Yugoslavia in his last days. His grandfather K. P. S. Menon (senior) was India's first Foreign Secretary, while his uncle K P S Menon (junior) was the former Indian ambassador to China and 15th Foreign Secretary. His great-grandfather Sir C. Sankaran Nair was a president of the Indian National Congress in 1897, so far the only Malayali to hold this position.

Menon did his schooling from Scindia School, Gwalior, and later did his MA in history from the St. Stephen's College, Delhi.

Career
Menon started his career in 1972 with the Indian Foreign Service.

He served in the Department of Atomic Energy (DAE) as Advisor to the Atomic Energy Commission. His work continued through his posting in Vienna. He was then posted to Beijing, the second of three postings he served in China. His last position in China as ambassador was also significant as it marked improvement in Sino-India relations, the high point being the visit of then Prime Minister Atal Bihari Vajpayee. Menon has also served as Ambassador to Israel and High Commissioner to Sri Lanka and Pakistan. He was appointed Foreign Secretary in 2006, and was the National Security Advisor to Prime Minister Dr. Manmohan Singh. He relinquished office as India's 4th National Security Advisor on 15 May 2014. He is also currently a Visiting Professor of International Relations at Ashoka University.

A major milestone of his career was the Indo-US nuclear deal, for which he had worked hard to convince NSG member nations along with Shyam Saran to get a clean waiver for nuclear supplies to India.

Menon joined the Brookings Institution (USA) as a distinguished fellow and also serves as chairman of the advisory board of the Institute of Chinese Studies based in New Delhi. He has been a Fisher Family Fellow at the Kennedy School, Harvard University, 2015 and Richard Wilhelm Fellow at MIT in 2015. He was chosen to be one of the “Top 100 Global Thinkers” by Foreign Policy magazine in 2010.

He joined the Institute of South Asian Studies at National University of Singapore as a Distinguished Visiting Fellow in November 2017.

Publications 

 Choices: Inside the Making of India's Foreign Policy. 2016. Brookings Institution Press. Penguin.
 India and Asian Geopolitics: The Past, Present. 2021. Brookings Institution Press.

Menon wrote "Choices: Inside The Making of Indian Foreign Policy" that was first published in 2016 and was based on his experience as National Security Advisor Of India.

Personal life
He is married to Mohini Menon and has a daughter and a son. His mother tongue is Malayalam and he also speaks Hindi, English, Chinese and German.

He has interests in classical music and the Himalayas. The Scindia School conferred on Shivshankar Menon the 'Madhav Award' as an alumnus of eminence for the year 2000.

Honours
  Order of the Rising Sun, 2nd Class, Gold and Silver Star (2022)

See also
Vijay Gokhale
Dr. S Jaishankar

References

1949 births
Living people
High Commissioners of India to Sri Lanka
High Commissioners of India to Pakistan
Indian Foreign Secretaries
Ambassadors of India to China
Ambassadors of India to Israel
People from Ottapalam
Malayali people
Scindia School alumni
Indian Foreign Service officers
Recipients of the Order of the Rising Sun, 2nd class
People of the Sri Lankan Civil War
Indian Peace Keeping Force